Wiedemannia is a genus of flies in the family Empididae.

Species
W. aequilobata Mandaron, 1964
W. aerea Vaillant, 1967
W. agilis Vaillant, 1950
W. alpina (Engel, 1918)
W. alticola Vaillant, 1950
W. andreevi Joost, 1982
W. angelieri Vaillant, 1967
W. apicalis Sinclair, 1998
W. aquilex (Loew, 1869)
W. ariadne Wagner, 1981
W. ariolae Pusch, 1996
W. armata (Engel, 1918)
W. arvernensis Vaillant, 1964
W. astigmatica (Stackelberg, 1937)
W. austriaca Vaillant, 1964
W. azurea (Vaillant, 1951)
W. balkanica Wagner, 1981
W. beckeri (Mik, 1889)
W. berthelemyi Vaillant & Vincon, 1987
W. bicolorata Vaillant, 1960
W. bicuspidata (Engel, 1918)
W. bifida Vaillant, 1964
W. bilobata Oldenberg, 1910
W. bistigma (Curtis, 1834)
W. bohemani (Zetterstedt, 1838)
W. braueri (Mik, 1880)
W. bravonae Pusch, 1996
W. brevilamelata Wagner, 1985
W. carpathia Vaillant, 1967
W. caucasica Joost, 1981
W. chvalai Joost, 1981
W. chvali Joost, 1981
W. comata Melander, 1928
W. corsicana Vaillant, 1964
W. crinita Engel, 1918
W. czernyi (Bezzi, 1905)
W. debilis Collin, 1961
W. digitata Vaillant & Vincon, 1987
W. digna Sinclair, 2006
W. dinarica Engel, 1940
W. dyonysica Wagner, 1990
W. edendalensis Smith, 1969
W. erminea (Mik, 1887)
W. escheri (Zetterstedt, 1838)
W. falcifera Vaillant, 1967
W. foliacea Vaillant, 1960
W. glaciola Wagner, 1985
W. gorongoza Smith, 1969
W. gracilis Vaillant, 1950
W. graeca Vaillant & Wagner, 1990
W. gubernans Melander, 1928
W. hastata (Mik, 1880)
W. hirtiloba (Speiser, 1924)
W. hughesi Smith, 1969
W. hygrobia (Loew, 1858)
W. impudica (Mik, 1880)
W. insularis Collin, 1927
W. iphigeniae Ivković & Sinclair, 2017
W. jadzewskii Niesiolowski, 1987
W. jakubi Krysiak, 2005
W. jugorum (Strobl, 1893).
W. juvenilis Zetterstedt, 1842
W. kacanskae Horvat, 1993
W. kallistes Pusch, 1996
W. kenyae Sinclair, 1999
W. klausnitzeri Joost, 1981
W. koeppeni Joost, 1980
W. kroatica Wagner, 1981
W. lagunae (Becker, 1908)
W. lamellata (Loew, 1869)
W. languedocica Vaillant, 1964
W. lepida (Melander, 1902)
W. litardierei Vaillant, 1956
W. ljerkae Ivković & Sinclair, 2017
W. longicornis (Mik, 1887)
W. lota Walker, 1851
W. martini Pusch, 1996
W. mauersbergeri Joost, 1984
W. maxima Wagner, 1984
W. medjahedica Vaillant & Gagneur, 1998
W. mgounica Vaillant, 1956
W. microstigma (Bezzi, 1904)
W. mikiana (Bezzi, 1899)
W. mirousei Vaillant, 1956
W. nebulosa Ivković & Sinclair, 2017
W. nevadensis Wagner, 1990
W. oldenbergi (Engel, 1918)
W. oredonensis Vaillant, 1967
W. ornata (Engel, 1918)
W. oxystoma (Bezzi, 1905)
W. phantasma (Mik, 1880)
W. pieninensis Krysiak & Niesiolowski, 2004
W. plavensis Raffone, 2011
W. pohoriana Horvat, 1995
W. pseudoberthelemyi Ivković & Sinclair, 2017
W. pseudovaillanti Joost, 1981
W. pusilla (Loew, 1858)
W. pyrenaica Vaillant, 1967
W. quercifolia (Engel, 1918)
W. queyarasiana Vaillant, 1956
W. reducta Jones, 1940
W. rhynchops (Nowicki, 1868)
W. rivulorum Wagner, 1990
W. rudebecki Smith, 1967
W. rufipes (Oldenberg, 1915)
W. similis Vaillant, 1960
W. simplex (Loew, 1862)
W. sorex (Engel, 1918)
W. stylifera Mik, 1889
W. submarina Jones, 1940
W. syriaca Wagner, 1982
W. thienemanni Wagner, 1982
W. thomasi Vaillant, 1968
W. tiburica Wagner & Cobo, 2001
W. tricuspidata (Bezzi, 1905)
W. uncinata Sinclair, 1997
W. undulata Sinclair, 1997
W. vaillanti Joost, 1981
W. veletica Vaillant & Chvála, 1973
W. vexillum Sinclair, 1997
W. wachtli (Mik, 1880)
W. zetterstedti (Fallén, 1826)
W. zwicki Wagner, 1982

References

Empidoidea genera
Wiedemannia